The 2002 GP Miguel Induráin was the 49th edition of the GP Miguel Induráin cycle race and was held on 6 April 2002. The race was won by Ángel Vicioso.

General classification

References

2002
2002 in Spanish road cycling